This is a list of yearly Great Northwest Athletic Conference football standings.

Great Northwest standings

References

Standings
Great Northwest Athletic Conference